This is a list of men's  and women's national baseball teams in the world. It consists of all men's and women's baseball teams representing their nation, country, or territory and which are members of the World Baseball Softball Confederation (WBSC).

Men's national baseball teams

Current

This section lists the current:
128 men's national baseball teams associated to WBSC.

The five confederations are:
Africa — African Baseball & Softball Association (ABSA)
Americas — Pan American Baseball Confederation (COPABE)
Asia — Baseball Federation of Asia (BFA)
Europe — Confederation of European Baseball (CEB)
Oceania — Baseball Confederation of Oceania (BCO)

The current holders of the World Baseball Classic are marked by ♠. The current participants in the 2017 World Baseball Classic are marked by ♣.

ABSA (Africa)
24 members of the African Baseball & Softball Association under it.

BCO (Oceania)
14 members of the Baseball Confederation of Oceania under it.

† Provisional members

BFA (Asia)
24 members of the Baseball Federation of Asia under it.

1. Commonly known as 'Taiwan'; competing as 'Chinese Taipei'

CEB (Europe)
39 members of the Confederation of European Baseball under it.

† Provisional members

COPABE (North and Central America, Caribbean and South America)
27 members of the Pan American Baseball Confederation under it.

1. Formerly known as 'Netherlands Antilles'

Former
These national teams no longer exist.

Women's

BFA (Asia) 
At least 8 members of the Baseball Federation of Asia under it.

BCO (Oceania) 
At least a member of the Baseball Confederation of Oceania under it.

CEB (Europe) 
At least 4 members of the Confederation of European Baseball under it.

COPABE (North and Central America, Caribbean and South America) 
At least six members of the Pan American Baseball Confederation under it.

See also

External links
World Baseball Softball Confederation
World Baseball Classic